Brandon Robert Briones (born April 29, 2001) is an American artistic gymnast.  He is the 2018 Youth Olympic vault champion and was a reserve athlete for the 2020 Olympic men's gymnastics team.

Personal life 
Briones was born in Park Ridge, Illinois to Laurie and Deo Briones; he grew up in Gilbert, Arizona.

Gymnastics career

Junior

2017 
Briones competed at the RD761 International Junior Team Cup where he helped the USA place third as a team.  Individually he placed second in the all-around behind Shiga Tachibana of Japan.  During event finals he won silver on floor exercise, pommel horse, and rings and won bronze on parallel bars and horizontal bar.  Briones next competed at the Winter Cup where he placed tenth in the all-around, competing against both junior and senior athletes.  Briones competed at the 2017 Junior Olympic National Championships where he won gold in the all-around.  In June Briones broke his leg and was unable to compete for the remainder of the season.

2018 
Briones returned to competition at the Elite Team Cup where his region placed second.  In June Briones competed at the Junior Pan American Championships where he helped the USA finish first as a team and individually Briones won gold in the all-around. At the U.S. National Championships Briones placed first in the junior division (17-18).  Additionally he placed first on rings and horizontal bar, third on floor exercise, pommel horse, and parallel bars, and sixth on vault.

Briones was later selected to represent the United States at the 2018 Summer Youth Olympics held in Buenos Aires, Argentina.  At the Youth Olympic Games Briones won gold on vault.  Additionally he placed fourth in the all-around, rings, and horizontal bar, and fifth on floor exercise and pommel horse.

In November Briones signed his National Letter of Intent with Stanford Cardinal men's gymnastics team.

Senior

2020–21 
Briones began competing for the Stanford Cardinal gymnastics team in 2020; however the NCAA season was cut short due to the ongoing COVID-19 pandemic.

Briones returned to competition at the 2021 NCAA Championships where he helped Stanford defend their team title.  Individually he came in third in the all-around behind teammate Brody Malone and Shane Wiskus of Minnesota.  At the 2021 U.S. National Championships Briones finished in fourth place behind Malone, Yul Moldauer, and Sam Mikulak.  As a result he qualified to compete at the upcoming Olympic Trials. At the Olympic Trials Briones finished fifth in the all-around.  He was named as an alternate for the Olympic team.

Competitive history

References

External links 

 

Living people
2001 births
Sportspeople from Park Ridge, Illinois
American male artistic gymnasts
Gymnasts at the 2018 Summer Youth Olympics
Youth Olympic gold medalists for the United States
Stanford Cardinal men's gymnasts